St. Paul's Episcopal Church and Churchyard is a historic Episcopal church located at W. Church and Broad Streets in Edenton, Chowan County, North Carolina, United States. It was built between 1736 and 1766, and is a five-bay, brick church building with a gable roof. It features a slightly engaged square tower. The interior was restored to its 19th-century appearance following a fire in 1949. The churchyard includes the graves of a number of prominent personages including Stephen Cabarrus, Governor Charles Eden, Governor Thomas Pollock, and Henderson Walker.

St. Paul's Parish was established in 1701, as part of the colonial Church of England. The church is the second oldest church building in North Carolina, and the only colonial church still in regular parish use.

It was listed on the National Register of Historic Places in 1975.

See also
 List of the oldest buildings in North Carolina

References

External links

 Official website
 
 

Historic American Buildings Survey in North Carolina
Episcopal church buildings in North Carolina
Churches on the National Register of Historic Places in North Carolina
Churches completed in 1766
18th-century Episcopal church buildings
Churches in Chowan County, North Carolina
National Register of Historic Places in Chowan County, North Carolina